Hon. Sir Gilbert Stone (1886 – 14 May 1967), was a British Judge and Liberal Party politician.

Background
Stone was born the son of Richard and Elizabeth Stone. He was educated at Wrekin College and Caius College, Cambridge. In 1912 he married Elsie Lawton Scott. They had one son.

Professional career
Stone had a career in law. He became a Barrister in 1911 and was admitted to Lincoln's Inn. He served as a Judge for the High Court of Judicature at Madras, India from 1930–35. He was knighted in 1936. He served as Chief Justice of the High Court at Nagpur from 1936–43.

Political career
Stone was a supporter of the Coalition Government led by David Lloyd George. He was National Liberal candidate for the Newcastle-upon-Tyne East division at the 1922 General Election. He sought to unseat the sitting Liberal MP who opposed the coalition and Stone had the backing of the local Unionist association. The Liberal MP duly lost his seat but to the Labour Party candidate and Stone finished third. Eight months later, he was to contest the 1923 Leeds Central by-election as a Liberal candidate, aiming to take a seat from the Unionists. The Unionists held the seat as Stone finished third again. Lloyd George led his National Liberals into a merger with the Liberal Party and Stone was happy to contest the general election, 4 months later as a Liberal candidate. 
He was Liberal candidate for the South Derbyshire division at the 1923 General Election. He again finished third, despite polling nearly 30% of the vote. He did not stand for parliament again.

Electoral record

References

1886 births
1967 deaths
Liberal Party (UK) parliamentary candidates
People educated at Wrekin College
Alumni of Gonville and Caius College, Cambridge
Members of Lincoln's Inn